The 2000 United States Senate election in Pennsylvania was held on November 7, 2000 during a year which coincided with a United States presidential election in which Pennsylvania was viewed as a swing state.Pennsylvania was one of four states that elected Republican Senators despite being won by Al Gore in the concurrent presidential election, the others being Maine, Rhode Island and Vermont. 

Incumbent Republican U.S. Senator Rick Santorum won re-election to a second term. , this was the last time the Republicans won the Class 1 Senate seat from Pennsylvania.

Democratic primary

Candidates
Tom Foley, former Pennsylvania Secretary of Labor and Industry and nominee for Lt. Governor in 1994
Ron Klink, U.S. Representative from Murrysville
Allyson Schwartz, State Senator from Northeast Philadelphia

Campaign
The contest began for Democrats with a close primary challenge; U.S. Congressman Klink narrowly defeated State Senator Allyson Schwartz and former lieutenant governor nominee Tom Foley by portraying himself as the only candidate who could defeat Santorum.

General election

Candidates
Robert Domske (Reform)
John Featherman (Libertarian)
Ron Klink, U.S. Representative from Murrysville (Democratic)
Rick Santorum, incumbent U.S. Senator since 1995 (Republican)
Lester Searer (Constitution)

Campaign
Santorum had gained a reputation as a polarizing figure during his first term in the Senate and had lost the support of more moderate members of his own party by 1999, but entered the race with a large fundraising advantage and high levels of support from the political right. Klink was viewed as a viable choice because he was a traditional Democrat on most issues and had strong union ties but also was opposed to abortion rights, which Democrats hoped would return votes to their party in the heavily Catholic but economically liberal coal regions of the state. The campaign turned increasingly negative as both candidates publicly questioned each other's integrity.

Enthusiasm around Klink's campaign then waned as liberal Democrats balked at donating to a candidate who was almost as socially conservative as Santorum. This was especially true in Philadelphia, where Klink was all but unknown. Klink was also badly outspent, leaving him unable to expand his presence in the state; he didn't run a single advertisement on Philadelphia television stations. Ultimately, Klink only carried eight counties as Santorum, who had achieved nationwide prominence for taking positions against abortion and LGBT rights in the United States, was ultimately able to secure victory.

Debates
Complete video of debate, September 30, 2000
Complete video of debate, October 14, 2000
Complete video of debate, October 23, 2000

Results

See also 
 2000 United States Senate elections

References 

2000
Rick Santorum
Pennsylvania
United States Senate